Bihar Football Association is the state governing body of football in Bihar, India. The Bihar men's and women's football team are administrated by the association. It is affiliated with the All India Football Federation, the national administrating body for football in India. The Bihar State Soccer League is the top-flight football league of Bihar.

Competitions

Men's
Bihar State Soccer League
Moin-ul-Haq Cup
All India Chaturbhuj Cup

Women's
Bihar State Women’s League

References 

Football governing bodies in India
Football in Bihar
1968 establishments in Bihar
Sports organizations established in 1968
Organisations based in Patna